Phalaenopsis luteola is a species of orchid endemic to Borneo. The specific epithet luteola, from the Latin luteolus meaning "yellowish", refers to the floral colouration.

Description
These lithophytic plants have fleshy adventitious roots, which are produced on very short stems, which bear up to three leaves. The leaves are elliptic, sessile, up to 20 cm long and 5 cm wide. Axillary, arching racemes produce 2-3 pale yellow flowers with irregular brown transverse barring. The lateral lobes of the labellum are yellow and the middle lobe is red.

Ecology
This species is found on wet mossy rock.

Taxonomy
This species is accepted. However, two sources regard it as synonym of Phalaenopsis pantherina.

Differentiation from Phalaenopsis maculata
This species has larger flowers than Phalaenopsis maculata. The ground colour is yellow and the lateral sepals are shaped differently. In Phalaenopsis maculata flowers, which have an off-white ground colour tinged with green, they are divergent and in Phalaenopsis luteola they are falcate to subparallel.

Horticulture
This species is very rarely cultivated. It has been reintroduced to cultivation by Gruss and Röllke in Germany.

Conservation
Information on the distribution of epiphytic orchids is currently insufficient. It appears to be rare in nature and the information needed for conservation efforts is lacking.
International trade is regulated through the CITES appendix II regulations of international trade.

References

luteola
Orchids of Borneo
Orchids of Indonesia
Lithophytic orchids
Plants described in 2001